Ophrys ferrum-equinum, the horseshoe bee-orchid,  is a terrestrial species of orchid native to Albania, Greece, and Turkey, including Crete and other islands of the Aegean. It owes its species name to the characteristic shape of a silver horse-shoe on the brown petal.

Subspecies
Two subspecies are currently recognized (May 2014):

Ophrys ferrum-equinum subsp. ferrum-equinum - Albania, Greece, Turkey
Ophrys ferrum-equinum subsp. gottfriediana (Renz) E.Nelson - Greece

References

External links 

ferrum-equinum
Flora of Albania
Flora of Crete
Flora of Greece
Flora of Turkey
Plants described in 1807
Taxa named by René Louiche Desfontaines